Paul Walter Napolitano (February 3, 1923 – June 22, 1997) was an American basketball player. He played college basketball for the University of San Francisco before going on to play professionally. In 1948, he won the National Basketball League championship and the World Professional Basketball Tournament with the Minneapolis Lakers. A good shooter, Napolitano was known for his one-handed jumpshot at a time when two-handed shots where the norm, with coach John Kundla calling it the "California shot".

High school career
Napolitano was a star center for McClymonds High School in Oakland, California and was named the O.A.L. player of the year and to the Oakland All-City Quintet in 1941.

Playing career
Napolitano's college career at the University of San Francisco was interrupted by World War II and in 1943, he joined the United States Coast Guard. He played basketball for the Coast Guard's Sealions alongside Jim Pollard. 

After World War II, Pollard played amateur basketball for one season with the Dardi Dandies of the Amateur Athletic Union. The following season, he joined the Oakland Bittners in the same league. He played one season with the Bittners, again alongside Pollard, and was named an AAU All-American that year while helping the team finish as a runner-up to the AAU championship.

Later he was selected in the 1947 BAA Draft by the St. Louis Bombers. The same year, both Napolitano and Pollard joined the Minneapolis Lakers of the National Basketball League. Playing the guard position, he averaged 3.0 points in 52 regular seasons games. In April 1948, he helped the Lakers win the World Professional Basketball Tournament, defeating the New York Renaissance 75–71 in the title game, behind George Mikans 40 points. The same month, he helped the Lakers win the 1948 NBL championship.

He was released by the Lakers prior to the start of the following season. He later signed with the Indianapolis Jets where he appeared in one game before being released in December 1948.

Later life
Following his professional career, Napolitano continued to play amateur basketball. He was a bar manager and owner for several years and later worked as a bartender at Original Joe's in San Francisco.

Death
On June 22, 1997, Napolitano and his wife, Pauline, were killed in a mobile home fire in Pacheco, California. Napolitano died soon after he was taken to an area hospital while his wife was declared dead at the scene. Fire investigators said that it appeared to be an accident and was possibly started by a cigarette or electrical problems.

BAA career statistics

Regular season

References

External links

1923 births
1997 deaths
Amateur Athletic Union men's basketball players
American men's basketball players
Basketball players from California
Deaths from fire in the United States
Forwards (basketball)
Guards (basketball)
Indianapolis Jets players
Minneapolis Lakers players
People from Clayton, California
San Francisco Dons men's basketball players
Sportspeople from the San Francisco Bay Area
St. Louis Bombers (NBA) draft picks